The Shadow Secretary of State for Education, also called the Shadow Education Secretary, is an office in the Official Opposition Shadow Cabinet responsible for Opposition policy on education and for holding the Secretary of State for Education, junior education ministers, and the Department for Education to account.

List of Shadow Secretaries of State

See also
 Official Opposition frontbench

References

Notes

Official Opposition (United Kingdom)